Black Lagoon is an anime television series adapted from the titular manga series by Rei Hiroe. Directed by Sunao Katabuchi and produced by Madhouse, it consists of two seasons produced for television, and one in original video animation format. The two seasons, each twelve episodes in length, are titled Black Lagoon— which was co-produced by Shogakukan—and Black Lagoon: The Second Barrage. The OVA, titled Black Lagoon: Roberta's Blood Trail, consists of only five episodes. The series takes place during the mid-1990s and follows the adventures of Rokuro "Rock" Okajima, a Japanese businessman who is abducted by, and eventually joins a group of outlaws known as the "Lagoon Company".

The first season premiered on Chiba TV from April 8 through June 24, 2006, the second from October 2 through December 18 on Sendai Television and Kyushu Asahi Broadcasting. All twenty-four episodes were then released in Japan on DVD across 12 volumes from July 26, 2006, through June 27, 2007. Blu-ray Disc releases—eight volumes in total—followed from December 23, 2009, through March 25, 2010. In North America, these seasons were first released across six DVD volumes with English and Japanese audio tracks and English subtitles from May 22, 2007, through October 28, 2008. The first three of these were distributed by Geneon Entertainment USA before Funimation took over distribution of the series in mid 2008, and released a hybrid DVD and Blu-ray Disc collection of both seasons on December 4, 2012. In Europe, MVM Entertainment released them across six DVD volumes from March 10, 2008, through January 5, 2009, and across two Blu-ray Disc collections on July 30, 2012. In Australia and New Zealand, Madman Entertainment released them across six DVD volumes from March 19 through September 17, 2008. The OVA was released in Japan simultaneously on DVD and Blu-ray Disc volumes containing one episode each between July 17, 2010, and June 22, 2011. For the North American market, Funimation announced a hybrid release of the OVA for August 6, 2013.

Six pieces of theme music were used for the series. For the first 23 episodes, "Red Fraction" by Mell serves as opening theme, and "Don't Look Behind" by Edison is used as closing theme, except for the fifteenth episode, which features "The World of Midnight" by Minako Obata. Episode twenty-four lacks an opening theme and uses "Peach Headz Addiction" by Breath Frequency as closing theme. The last five episodes use "Red Fraction –IO Drive mix–" by Mell as opening theme. "When Johnny Comes Marching Home" by Edison is used as closing theme for episodes 25 through 28. "This Moment: Prayer in the Light" by Minako "mooki" Obata is used as the closing theme in the final episode.

Episodes

Season 1 (2006)

The Second Barrage (2006)

Roberta's Blood Trail (OVAs; 2010–11)

Home media

See also

References

Black Lagoon
Black Lagoon